Palmer v Simmonds (1854) 2 Drew 221 is an English trusts law case, concerning the certainty of subject matter to create a trust. Its outcome may have become outdated by the more recent judgments in In re Roberts and Re Golay's Will Trusts.

Facts
Henrietta Rosco, the settlor, said she wanted to create a trust for various people over her property, and then to ‘leave the bulk of my said residuary estate unto the said William Fountain Simmonds, James Simmonds, Thomas Elrington Simmonds and Henrietta Rosco Markham equally.’

Judgment
Sir RT Kindersley held that because the court could not be sure which parts of the residue were meant to be held on trust, the trust failed. The term "bulk" was too uncertain for the court to determine what was meant.

See also

English trust law

Notes

References

English trusts case law
Court of Chancery cases
1854 in British law
1854 in case law